Robert or Bob Geddes may refer to:

 Robert L. Geddes, Idaho politician
 Bobby Geddes, footballer
Bob Geddes, character in The Human Jungle (film)
Bob Geddes, American football player, see Jets–Patriots rivalry
Robert Geddes (architect) (1923–2023), American architect, dean of the Princeton University School of Architecture (1965–1982)